Ločenice is a municipality and village in České Budějovice District in the South Bohemian Region of the Czech Republic. It has about 800 inhabitants.

Administrative parts
The village of Nesměň is an administrative part of Ločenice.

References

Villages in České Budějovice District